pSeven is a DSE (Design Space Exploration) software platform developed by DATADVANCE that features design, simulation and analysis capabilities and assists in design decisions. It provides integration with third party CAD and CAE software tools, multi-objective and robust optimization algorithms, data analysis, and uncertainty quantification tools.

pSeven comes under the notion of PIDO (Process Integration and Design Optimization) software. Design Space Exploration functionality is based on the mathematical algorithms of pSeven Core (formerly known as MACROS) Python library, also developed by DATADVANCE.

History
The foundation for the pSeven Core library as pSeven's background was laid in 2003, when the researchers from the Institute for Information Transmission Problems started collaborating with Airbus to perform R&D in the domains of simulation and data analysis. The first version of pSeven Core library was created in association with EADS Innovation Works in 2009. Since 2012, pSeven software platform for simulation automation, data analysis and optimization is developed and marketed by DATADVANCE, incorporating pSeven Core.

Functionality
pSeven's functionality can be divided into following blocks: Data & Model Analysis, Predictive Modeling, Design Optimization and Process Integration.

Data & Model Analysis 

pSeven provides a variety of tools for data and model analysis:

Design of Experiments 
Design of Experiments includes the following techniques:
 Space Filling 
 Batch techniques (Random, Full-Factorial, Latin hypercube sampling, Optimal LHS)
 Sequential techniques (Random, Halton, Sobol, Faure sequences)
 Optimal Designs for RSM
 Composite, D-optimal, IV-optimal, Box Behnken
 Adaptive DoE with Uniform, Maximum Variance and Integrated Mean Squared Errors Gain  Maximum Variance criteria.

Design of Experiments allows controlling the process of surrogate modeling via adaptive sampling plan, which benefits the quality of approximation. As a result, it ensures time and resource saving on experiments and smarter decision-making based on the detailed knowledge of the design space.

Sensitivity and Dependency Analysis 
Sensitivity and Dependence analysis are used to filter non-informative design parameters in the study, ranking the informative ones with respect to their influence on the given response function and selecting parameters that provide the best approximation. It is applied to better understand the variables affecting the design process.

Uncertainty Quantification 
Uncertainty Quantification capabilities in pSeven are based on OpenTURNS library. They are used to improve the quality of the designed products, manage potential risks at the design, manufacturing and operating stages and to guarantee product reliability.

Dimension Reduction 
Dimension reduction is the process of reducing the number of random variables under consideration by obtaining a set of principal variables.

Predictive Modeling 
Predictive modeling capabilities in pSeven are based on building, exploring and managing approximation models. pSeven incorporates several proprietary approximation techniques, including methods for ordered and structured data, allowing to understand behavior of user's system with minimal costs, replace expensive computations by approximation models (metamodels, RSM, surrogate models etc.) and make smarter decisions based on detailed knowledge of the design space.

Design Optimization 
Optimization algorithms implemented in pSeven allow solving single and multi-objective constrained optimization problems as well as robust and reliability based design optimization problems. Users can solve both engineering optimization problems with cheap to evaluate semi-analytical models and the problems with expensive (in terms of CPU time) objective functions and constraints.

SmartSelection technique automatically and adaptively selects the most suitable optimization algorithm for a given optimization problem from a pool of optimization methods and algorithms in pSeven.

Process Integration 
Process integration capabilities are used to capture the design process by automating single simulation, trade-off studies and design space exploration. For that, pSeven provides tools to build and automatically run the workflow, to configure and share workflows with other design team members, to distribute computation over different computing resources, including HPC. 
Main process integration tools of pSeven:
 Graphical user interface and command-line interface for advanced users 
 Comprehensive library of workflow building blocks 
 CAD/CAE integration adapters (SolidWorks, CATIA, NX, PTC Creo, KOMPAS-3D, ANSYS Workbench), CAE solvers and other engineering tools (ANSYS Mechanical, ANSYS CFD, FloEFD, CST Microwave Studio, ADAMS, Simulink, MATLAB, Scilab, Abaqus, Unified FEA, Nastran, LS-DYNA, Simcenter STAR-CCM+, OpenFOAM, etc.)
 High Performance Computing (HPC) capabilities (supported batch systems: SLURM, TORQUE, LSF)
 Functional Mock-up Interface (FMI) for model exchange and co-simulation

Application Areas
pSeven's application areas are different industries such as aerospace, automotive, energy, electronics, biomedical and others.

Application examples:
 Multidisciplinary and multi-objective optimization of an aircraft family
 Sizing of composite structures in order to reduce their mass subject to various mechanical and manufacturing constraints
 Construction of quick and accurate behavioral models (surrogate models) in order to enable efficient and secure exchange of models across Extended Enterprise
 Optimization of the gas path of the steam turbine in order to improve overall turbine efficiency
 Optimization of layered composite armor in order to reduce its weight

References

External links 
 Official website

Computer system optimization software
Mathematical optimization software
Optimization algorithms and methods